Jericka Duncan   (born August 12, 1983) is an American national TV news correspondent for CBS News in New York City. In 2018, she made headlines when she came forward with texts that Jeff Fager sent to her as she covered sexual allegations made towards him.

Early life and education
Jericka Duncan was born in 1983. She attended Aurora High School, Ohio and graduated in 2001. At Aurora H.S., she was on the basketball team and the track and field team. As a track & field competitor, Duncan set five records for Aurora High School. Once she graduated from high school, Duncan went on to attend Ohio University, Athens, Ohio where she pursued a Communication degree. In college, Duncan continued to run track & field and was captain of the track team. She received the NAACP Image Award of Athletics in 2005. That same year, Duncan received her Bachelor of Arts in Communication when she graduated from Ohio University.

Career 
After graduating in May 2005, Duncan became a reporter for the NBC-affiliated television station WETM-TV in Elmira, New York. Afterward, she began reporting for the CBS-affiliated television station WIVB-TV in Buffalo, New York. In 2010, she moved to CBS-owned station KYW-TV in Philadelphia, Pennsylvania and in 2013, became a national correspondent for CBS News. Duncan has reported during memorable events such as the winter weather in Boston, the 70th anniversary of D-Day in 2014, the first anniversary of Hurricane Sandy and the Washington Navy Yard shooting.

Notable works and awards
In 2007, Duncan received the "Best Spot News Coverage" award from the New York State Broadcasters Association Award.
In 2008, Duncan won a local "Best Morning Show" Emmy award after reporting on winter storms.
In 2011 and 2012, Duncan covered the Philadelphia basement kidnapping, or the "Basement of Horror" case, where she reported on the captivity of four adults and the theft of their social security checks by their detainer. This led to Duncan winning a first place award from the Associated Press and receiving a nomination for a Mid-Atlantic Emmy Award.
In 2012, Duncan was acknowledged as the "Broadcast Journalist of the Year" from the Philadelphia Association of Black Journalists.

Jeff Fager 
In 2018, Jeff Fager was fired as executive producer of 60 Minutes after it was revealed that he sent Duncan threatening text messages. Duncan exposed these text messages in September 2018. Fager had been accused of sexual harassment by several women who worked for him. When Duncan was reporting on the story, Fager threatened her by saying, "If you repeat these false accusations without any of your own reporting to back them up you will be responsible for hurting me. Be careful. There are people who lost their jobs trying to harm me and if you pass on these damaging claims without your own reporting to back them up that will become a serious problem." After revealing these text messages, Duncan was praised by the National Association of Black Journalists for covering a portion of the Me Too movement. Fager denied the original allegations, but confessed to sending the aggressive messages to Duncan.

Impact 
Once Duncan announced Fager's response to her, it opened up conversations regarding repercussions of reporting for the #MeToo movement. It led to the creation of the #reportingMeToo hashtag on Twitter. Also, this incident opened up a conversation about women being more likely to be assigned sexual harassment incidents and reporting messages from the accused.

Reactions 
In response to the moment when Fager was fired, Duncan was met with support from CBS coworkers Gayle King, Norah O'Donnell and John Dickerson. She was praised for taking a stand and revealing and reading aloud the text messages sent from Fager. A short time afterward, the Buffalo Association of Black Journalists announced Duncan as a leading speaker at one of their events titled "Social Media and Reporting on Race".

Jeff Glor of CBS Evening News was in the midst of covering Hurricane Florence as he said to Duncan, "You have done great work. It's difficult enough without dealing with this. That message was unacceptable. I think it's important for you to know, for everyone to know back there, that I, we, the entire team at Evening News supports you 100 percent."

References

American television journalists
American women television journalists
African-American women journalists
African-American journalists
CBS News people
Ohio University alumni
People from Aurora, Ohio
1983 births
Living people
21st-century African-American people
21st-century African-American women
20th-century African-American people
20th-century African-American women